Japonica saepestriata is a Theclinae butterfly found in woods of eastern Asia, especially Japan. It is single brooded and appears in early summer.

Food plant — Quercus mongolica.

Subspecies
 Japonica saepestriata saepestriata Ussuri, Japan.
 Japonica saepestriata gotohi Saigusa, 1993 Honshu.
 Japonica saepestriata takenakakazuoi Fujioka, 1993 Central China.

References

Theclini